Edward John Imwinkelried (born September 19, 1945) is an American educator and law scholar. the Edward L. Barrett, Jr. Professor of Law Emeritus at the UC Davis School of Law (King Hall). Imwinkelried is the most cited legal academic in the country in the area of Evidence law.  His book, Scientific Evidence, was cited twice by the U.S. Supreme Court in the ground-breaking evidence case, Daubert v. Merrell Dow Pharmaceuticals.

Education
He received a B.A. (magna cum laude) in Political Science from the University of San Francisco in 1967 and a J.D. (magna cum laude) from the University of San Francisco School of Law in 1969.

Military service
He graduated from The JAG School at the University of Virginia in June 1970 and commissioned an officer in the United States Army. From June 1970 to June 1971, he served as a Post Judge Advocate at the Rocky Mountain Arsenal in Denver, Colorado. He also served as a prosecuting attorney before United States Magistrate courts and as defense counsel in court-martials. From August 1971 to 1972, he served as an Assistant Staff Judge Advocate for XXIV Corps and the 196th Light Infantry Brigade in Vietnam. He also served as a claims officer and summary court-martial officer. From July 1972 to June 1974, he served as an Instructor for the Criminal Law Division of the Judge Advocate General's School in Charlottesville, Virginia. He left the service in 1974 as a Captain.

Academic career
From August 1974 to June 1979, he served as Professor of Law at University of San Diego School of Law teaching evidence, trial techniques, moot court, contracts, and legal writing. From January to May 1981, he was a visiting Professor of Law at the University of Illinois teaching legal profession. In the summer of 1981, he was a Professor of Law for the University of San Diego's program in Guadalajara, Mexico where he instructed Comparative Mexican-American Contract Law. From July 1979 to June 1985, he was a Professor of Law at Washington University in St. Louis School of Law, where he instructed evidence, trial techniques, scientific evidence, legal Ethics, and contracts.

In 1997, he was a visiting Professor of Law at the University of Houston in Houston, Texas. In 2003, he was a visiting Professor of Law at the University College Dublin in Dublin, Ireland.

In 2006, he was a visiting Professor of Law at Ohio State University Moritz College of Law in Columbus, Ohio.

From 1985 to 2013, he was a Edward L. Barrett, Jr. Professor of Law at UC Davis School of Law.

Since 2013, he has been Edward L. Barrett, Jr. Professor of Law Emeritus at UC Davis School of Law.

References

1945 births
Living people
University of San Francisco alumni
University of San Francisco School of Law alumni
UC Davis School of Law faculty
United States Army officers
United States Army personnel of the Vietnam War
University of San Diego faculty
University of Illinois faculty
Washington University in St. Louis faculty
University of Houston faculty
The Judge Advocate General's Legal Center and School alumni